Ismely Arias (born 4 August 1977) is a Cuban former archer. He competed in the men's individual event at the 2000 Summer Olympics.

References

External links
 

1977 births
Living people
Cuban male archers
Olympic archers of Cuba
Archers at the 2000 Summer Olympics
Place of birth missing (living people)
Archers at the 1999 Pan American Games
Pan American Games competitors for Cuba
20th-century Cuban people
21st-century Cuban people
Pan American Games medalists in archery
Pan American Games bronze medalists for Cuba
Medalists at the 1999 Pan American Games